Mike Adams may refer to:

Sports

American football
Mike Adams (offensive tackle) (born 1990), American football offensive tackle for the Pittsburgh Steelers
Mike Adams (safety) (born 1981), American football safety for the Carolina Panthers
Mike Adams (wide receiver) (born 1974), former American football wide receiver of the Pittsburgh Steelers

Other sports
Mike Adams (outfielder) (born 1948), Major League Baseball outfielder
Mike Adams (pitcher) (born 1978), Major League Baseball pitcher
Mike Adams (footballer) (born 1965), English former professional footballer
Mike Adams (football manager) (born 1959), English manager of the Grenada national football team

Other people
Mike Adams (columnist) (1964–2020), American conservative columnist
Mike Adams, founder of website Natural News

See also
Michael Adams (disambiguation)